Limb–mammary syndrome is a cutaneous condition characterized by p63 mutations.

See also 
 List of cutaneous conditions

References

Further reading
  GeneReviews/NCBI/NIH/UW entry on Ankyloblepharon-Ectodermal Defects-Cleft Lip/Palate Syndrome or AEC Syndrome, Hay-Wells Syndrome. Includes: Rapp–Hodgkin Syndrome

External links 

  OMIM entries on AEC

Cutaneous congenital anomalies
Syndromes affecting the skin